List of communities in Lunenburg County, Nova Scotia

Communities are ordered by the highway upon which they are located.  All routes start with the terminus located near the largest community.

Trunk Routes

Trunk 3: Middlewood - Italy Cross - Hebb's Cross - Hebbville - Bridgewater - Dayspring - Upper LaHave -Rhodes Corner -  Spectacle Lakes - Centre - Lunenburg - Deans Corner - Martin's Brook - Mader's Cove - Mahone Bay - Oakland - Martin's River - Martin's Point - Western Shore - Gold River - Chester Basin - Marriott's Cove - Robinsons Corner - Chester - East River
Trunk 10: Bridgewater - Cookville -West Northfield - Northfield - Pinehurst - New Germany - Meiseners Section - Cherryfield
Trunk 12: Chester Basin - Chester Grant - Seffernsville - New Ross - Aldersville

Collector Roads

Route 208: New Germany - Simpson's Corner - Hemford - Nineveh - Colpton
Route 210: Newcombville - Chelsea - Upper Chelsea
Route 324: Lunenburg - Lilydale -   Northwest - Fauxburg - Blockhouse - Middle New Cornwall - Upper New Cornwall
Route 325: Mahone Bay - Blockhouse - Maitland - Oak Hill - Bridgewater - Wileville - Newcombville - Bakers Settlement - West Clifford
Route 329: East River - Deep Cove - Blandford - Bayswater - Aspotogan - Northwest Cove - Mill Cove - Fox Point
Route 331: Bridgewater - Pleasantville - West LaHave - Pentz - LaHave - Dublin Shore - Crescent Beach - Petite Rivière - Broad Cove - Cherry Hill - Vogler's Cove
Route 332: Lunenburg - First South - Bayport - Rose Bay - Riverport - East LaHave - Middle LaHave - Upper LaHave

Communities located on rural roads

Auburndale
Back Centre
Barry's Corner
Barrs Corner
Beech Hill
Blue Rocks
Canaan
Clearland
Conquerall Mills
Crouse's Settlement
Crousetown
East Clifford
Elmwood
Farmington
Farmville
Feltzen South
First Peninsula
Five Houses
Forties
Franey Corner
Fraxville
Front Centre
Glengarry
Grimm's Settlement
Heckman's Island
Herman's Island
Indian Path
Indian Point
Kingsburg
Laconia
Lake Centre
Lake Ramsay
Lake William
Lapland
Leville
Lower Branch
Lower Northfield
Maplewood
Mader's Cove
Martins Point
Mason's Beach
Middle New Cornwall
Midville Branch
Mill Road
Mount Pleasant
New Canada
New Cumberland
New Elm
New Russell
Newburne
North River
Oakland
Parkdale
Pine Grove
Schnare's Crossing
Second Peninsula
Stanburn
Stanley Section
Stonehurst
Sunnybrook
Sweetland
Big Tancook Island
Tanner's Settlement
The Ovens
Union Square
Upper Branch
Upper Northfield
Walden
Waterloo

See also

Lunenburg County, Nova Scotia

Geography of Lunenburg County, Nova Scotia